Phone Link, previously Your Phone, is an app developed by Microsoft for Windows 10 for connecting Android to Windows 10 devices. It enables a Windows PC to access the 2000 most recent photos on a connected phone, send SMS messages, and make phone calls. As part of the Windows 10 October 2018 Update (1809), it replaces the legacy Phone Companion app. Phone Link can also be used to mirror the screen of an Android device; however this feature is currently in beta and only available on select Samsung devices with the Link to Windows service. The app also has a cross-device copy and paste feature allowing users to send copied text and images to and from the Android and Windows device using the same copy and paste shortcuts on each device, the feature currently works with the Samsung Galaxy S20, S20+, S20 Ultra, and the Z Flip.

History 
On May 26, 2015, Microsoft announced the Phone Companion app for connecting Windows 10 PCs to Windows Phone, Android, and iPhone.

At its Build 2018 event on May 7, 2018, Microsoft presented the Your Phone app, which allowed users to use their PCs to see recent photos on their phones, and to send SMS messages.

At Samsung's Galaxy Note10 launch event, Microsoft previewed the additional Your Phone feature of receiving phone calls directly on a PC via Bluetooth. The feature was made available for all Android phones on February 20, 2020.

On March 31, 2022, Your Phone was rebranded to Phone Link.

See also 
 ActiveSync
 My Phone
 Apple Continuity
 Windows Mobile Device Center
 Windows Phone

References 

Android (operating system)
Windows software